Nudaurelia richelmanni is a moth of the  family Saturniidae. It is known from Tanzania.

The ground colour of the forewings is red-yellow, similar to Nudaurelia gueinzii (Staudinger, 1872), finely brownish-violet dusted, particularly at the costa.

References

Endemic fauna of Tanzania
Saturniinae
Moths described in 1909
Insects of Tanzania
Moths of Africa